

Events

January
 January 3 – The last steam locomotive powered passenger train departs Washington Union Station; Richmond, Fredericksburg and Potomac Railroad engine number 622 Carter Braxton pulls the train, leaving at approximately 1:40 PM bound for Richmond, Virginia.
 January 8 – Southern Pacific Railroad's Sunset Limited becomes the first train to use the new New Orleans Union Passenger Terminal.

 January 20 – The Tokyo Metro Marunouchi Line, the second line in the system and the first built after World War II, is opened between Ikebukuro and Ochanomizu stations.
 January 24 – Cleveland, Ohio, streetcars make their last revenue run.
 January – General Motors Electro-Motive Division introduces the EMD F9 and GP9.

February
 February 21 – An SNCF electric train hits 151 mph (243 km/h) in tests, setting a world’s record.
 February – General Motors Electro-Motive Division introduces the EMD FP9.

March
 March 30 – Yonge subway, the first segment of the Toronto subway and the first underground rapid transit line in Canada, begins operation.

April
 April 20 – The Chicago, Milwaukee, St. Paul and Pacific Railroad ("Milwaukee Road") opens a new station in Tacoma, Washington.
 April 30 – Last day of steam locomotive operations and passenger train service on the Clinchfield Railroad.

May
 May – General Motors Electro-Motive Division introduces the EMD E9.

June
 June 6 – The Atchison, Topeka and Santa Fe Railway introduces the San Francisco Chief passenger train between Chicago and San Francisco.
 June 13 – Last day of steam locomotive operation on the Maine Central Railroad.
 June 14 – New York Central management loses a proxy fight for control of the railroad to Robert Ralph Young and his Alleghany Corporation.
 June – General Electric delivers the first diesel-electric locomotives built for the narrow gauge White Pass and Yukon Route.

July
 July 2 – SNCF electrifies first section of Valenciennes–Thionville line, the first non-experimental 25 kV AC railway electrification.
 July 4 – Budd delivers the first Château series car, Château Bienville, to Canadian Pacific Railway in Montreal.
 July – New Zealand Railways Department introduces DF class (built by English Electric) into service, the country's first mainline diesel-electric locomotives.

August
 August 7 – The last streetcars operate on the Altoona and Logan Valley Electric Railway in Altoona, Pennsylvania.

October
 October 16 – The Southern Pacific dieselizes its 3 foot (914 mm) gauge Keeler branch.
 October 20 – To commemorate the 100th Anniversary of Horseshoe Curve, the Sylvania Electric Products Corporation sponsors a night photograph of the Curve using more than 6500 flashbulbs.

November 
 November 29 – The first dome cars built by Budd Company enter revenue service on Spokane, Portland and Seattle Railway's North Coast Limited.

December
 December – Louisville and Nashville Railroad and Nashville, Chattanooga and St. Louis Railway open the new Radnor Yard in Nashville, Tennessee.
 December – Pullman-Standard builds the first bilevel commuter coaches for the Southern Pacific Railroad to use in the south San Francisco Bay Area.
 December – The last steam locomotive on the Southern Railway (U.S.) is retired from standby service.

Unknown date
 Circular Koltsevaya Line of the Moscow Metro completed.
 American Car and Foundry officially changes its name to ACF Industries, Inc.
 Atchison, Topeka and Santa Fe Railway divests itself of the Grand Canyon Hotel and other buildings at the north end of the Grand Canyon Railway.
 Netherlands Railway Museum moves to the former Maliebaan station.

Accidents

Births

Deaths

January deaths 
 January 5 – Death Valley Scotty (born Walter Edward Scott; pictured), con man who chartered the Scott Special record-breaking run on the Atchison, Topeka and Santa Fe Railway in 1905, dies (born 1872).

December deaths
 December 15 – Ernest Lemon, Chief Mechanical Engineer (1931–1932) and later Vice President of the London, Midland and Scottish Railway (born 1884).

References 
 Bianchi, Curt (May 1995), "By steam to the Grand Canyon", Trains Magazine, p. 38–45.
 Horseshoe Curve Chapter, National Railway Historical Society, "Under the Wire", The Altoona and Logan Valley Electric Railway: 1891–1954. Retrieved August 7, 2005.
 Rivanna Chapter, National Railway Historical Society (2005), This month in railroad history – November. Retrieved November 28, 2005.